Diego Jacinto Agustín Barros Arana (August 16, 1830 – November 4, 1907) was a Chilean professor, legislator, minister and diplomat. He is considered the most important Chilean historian of the 19th century. His main work General History of Chile is a 15-volume work that spanned over 300 years of the nation's history.

Barros Arana was of Basque descent. He also was an educator and a diplomat. He was director of the Instituto Nacional, a public high school, and of the University of Chile.

Works

List of works

See also
History of Chile

References

External links 

 

1830 births
1907 deaths
People from Santiago
Chilean people of Galician descent
Chilean people of Basque descent
19th-century Chilean historians
20th-century Chilean historians
20th-century Chilean male writers
Chilean diplomats
Members of the Chilean Academy of Language